Tau Orionis (τ Ori, τ Orionis) is a solitary star in the constellation Orion. If an imaginary line is drawn north-west between the stars Rigel and Mintaka, Tau Orionis can be found roughly one-sixth of the way to Mintaka. It is visible to the naked eye with an apparent visual magnitude of 3.58. Based upon an annual parallax shift of 6.6 mas, it is located around 490 light years from the Sun.

This is a B-type giant star with a stellar classification of B5III5 III. It has around 5.4 times the radius of the Sun and 6.2 times the Sun's mass. The star shines with 933 times the solar luminosity from its outer atmosphere at an effective temperature of 10,829 K. it is around 63 million years old, with a peculiar velocity through space of 16.9 km/s.

Tau Orionis has three visual companions: magnitude 11.0 component B at an angular separation of 33.30″ along a position angle of 251°; magnitude 10.9 component C lying some 3.80″ from component B; and magnitude 10.9 component D at 36.0″ from τ Ori along a position angle of 51°, all as of 2011.

Proper names
According to Richard H. Allen, this star, along with  β Eri, λ Eri and ψ Eri were Al Kursiyy al Jauzah, "the Chair (or "Footstool") of the Central One". However, per the catalogue of stars in the Technical Memorandum 33-507 - A Reduced Star Catalog Containing 537 Named Stars, Al Kursiyy al Jauzah were the title for just three stars: β Eri as Cursa, ψ Eri as Al Kursiyy al Jauzah I and λ Eri as Al Kursiyy al Jauzah II, excluding this star.

From this Chinese title, the name Yuh Tsing is derived.

References

External links
 

Suspected variables
B-type giants
Orion (constellation)
Orionis, Tau
Durchmusterung objects
Orionis, 20
024674
034503
1735